At the 1968 Summer Olympics in Mexico City, seven events in sprint canoe racing were contested.  The program was unchanged from the previous Games in 1964. Lake Xochimilco was where the events took place.

Medal table

Medal summary

Men's events

Women's events

References
1968 Summer Olympics official report Volume 3, Part 2. pp. 614–21. 
 

 
1968 Summer Olympics events
1968